Sir Edward Acton, 1st Baronet (baptised 20 July 1600 – buried 29 June 1659) was an English MP for Bridgnorth and High Sheriff of Shropshire, who supported Royalist cause during the English Civil War.

Biography
He was born the son of Sir Walter Acton of Aldenham Park and Frances Acton, near Bridgnorth, Shropshire. He was created 1st Baronet Acton of Aldenham (Aldenham Hall, in Morville), Shropshire on 17 January 1643 (1644?).

He married Sarah Mytton, daughter of Richard Mytton and Margaret Owen, in 1624.

Sir Edward was a Royalist during the English Civil War and fought at the Battle of Edgehill and the Siege of Bridgnorth.

Sir Edward was MP for Bridgnorth twice, first one from April 1640 to May 1640, the second one between November 1640 and 5 February 1644 during the Long and Short Parliaments and also sat in King Charles I's Parliament at Oxford.

He died  June 1659 and was buried on 29 June 1659.

Family
He married Sarah Mytton, sister of the parliamentarian general Thomas Mytton, and they had the following children:
Sir Walter Acton, 2nd Baronet (1621–1665)
Edward Acton (1622–1654)
Thomas Acton (1623–1677)
Frances Acton (1625–1626)
Robert Acton (1628–1654)
William Acton (1629–1659), father of Captain Edward Acton (Royal Navy officer)
Richard Acton (1633–1674)

The heirs to the title
Sir Edward Acton, 1st Baronet, MP for Bridgnorth 1640 and 1640-1644 (1600-1659)
Sir Walter Acton, 2d Baronet, MP for Bridgnorth 1660 (1620-1655)
Sir Edward Acton, 3d Baronet, MP for Bridgnorth 1689-1705 (1650-1716)
Sir Whitmore Acton, 4th Baronet, MP for Bridgnorth 1710-1713 (1678-1732)
Sir Richard Acton, 5th Baronet (1712-1791)
Sir John Francis Edward Acton, 6th Baronet (1736*1811)

References

Sources 

|-

1600 births
1659 deaths
Politicians from Shropshire
Baronets in the Baronetage of England
Cavaliers
English MPs 1640 (April)
English MPs 1640–1648
Oxford Parliaments
High Sheriffs of Shropshire
Edward
Royalist military personnel of the English Civil War